is a special ward in Tokyo, Japan. The English translation of its Japanese self-designation is Nakano City.

As of May 1, 2015, the ward has an estimated population of 322,731, and a population density of 20,701 persons per km2. The total area is 15.59 km2. Nakano is the most densely populated city in Japan.

History
The ward was founded on October 1, 1932, when the towns of Nogata and Nakano were absorbed into the former Tokyo City as Nakano Ward. The present administration dates from March 15, 1947, when the Allied occupation reformed the administration of Tokyo-to.
 1447: Ōta Dōkan defeated Toshima Yasutsune in a battle here.
 1606: The Naruki Kaidō, predecessor of today's Ōme Kaidō (a road to Ōme) was established.
 1695: In connection with the Shorui Awaremi no Rei (a law for the protection of animals), a facility for keeping wild dogs opened.
 1871: The twelve villages that comprise present-day Nakano became part of Tokyo Prefecture.
 1889: The Kofu Railway opens. The forerunner of today's Chūō Main Line included a station at Nakano en route from Shinjuku to Hachioji.
 1897: Nakano becomes a village.
 1932: Tokyo City expands to encompass the district that included Nakano.
 1943: With the abolition of Tokyo City, Nakano becomes part of Tokyo-to.
 1947: Nakano becomes one of the special wards under the new system.
 1961: The Tokyo subway system extends to Nakano.
 1973: Construction of Nakano Sun Plaza near Nakano Station reaches completion.

Districts and neighborhoods

Nakano Area
 Chūō
 Higashinakano
 Honchō
 Minamidai
 Nakano
 Yayoimachi

Nogata Area
 Arai
 Eharachō
 Ekoda
 Kamisaginomiya
 Kamitakada
 Maruyama
 Matsugaoka
 Nogata
 Numabukuro
 Saginomiya
 Shirasagi
 Wakamiya
 Yamatochō

Geography
Five special wards surround Nakano: Shinjuku, Suginami, Nerima, Shibuya, and Toshima. It lies just west of the bustling Shinjuku area.

Rivers include the Kanda, Myosho-ji and Zenpuku-ji Rivers, and the Aratama Waterway.

Places
Nakano Sun Plaza: concert hall, hotel facilities
 Arai Yakushi Shingon Buddhist temple
 Nakano Broadway: otaku building (several floors of arcades, manga, anime, idol, music, toy and subculture specialty shops, as well as a well-regarded Namco arcade)
 GRIPS International House, apartment for foreign students studying at the National Graduate Institute for Policy Studies

Education

Public schools
Metropolitan senior high and combined junior-senior high schools are operated by the Tokyo Metropolitan Government Board of Education.
 
 
 
 
 
 Yotsuya Commercial High School

Municipal kindergartens, elementary schools, and junior high schools are operated by the Nakano City Board of Education.

Municipal junior high schools:
 No. 2 Junior High School (第二中学校)
 No. 5 Junior High School (第五中学校)
 No. 7 Junior High School (第七中学校)
 Kita Nakano Junior High School (北中野中学校)
 Meiwa Junior High School (明和中学校)
 Merger of No. 4 Junior High School (第四中学校) and No. 8 Junior High School (第八中学校).
 Midorino Junior High School (緑野中学校)
 Minami Nakano Junior High School (南中野中学校)
 Nakano Junior High School (中野中学校)
 Nakano Higashi Junior High School (中野東中学校)
 Merger of No. 3 Junior High School (第三中学校) and No. 10 Junior High School (第十中学校).

Municipal elementary schools:
 Egota Elementary School (江古田小学校)
 Ehara Elementary School (江原小学校)
 Hakuo Elementary School (白桜小学校)
 Heiwa no Mori Elementary School (平和の森小学校)
 Kami Saginomiya Elementary School (上鷺宮小学校)
 Keimei Elementary School (啓明小学校)
 Kitahara Elementary School (北原小学校)
 Midorino Elementary School (緑野小学校)
 Mihato Elementary School (美鳩小学校)
 Formed by the merger of Wakamiya Elementary (若宮小学校) and Yamato Elementary (大和小学校)
 Minamidai Elementary School (南台小学校)
 Formed by the merger of Niiyama Elementary (新山小学校) and Tada Elementary (多田小学校)
 Minamino Elementary School (みなみの小学校)
 Formed by the merger of Nakano Shinmei Elementary (中野神明小学校) and Niiyama Elementary (新山小学校)
 Momozono No. 2 Elementary School (桃園第二小学校)
 Musashidai Elementary School (武蔵台小学校)
 Nakano No. 1 Elementary School (中野第一小学校)
 Merger of Monozono Elementary School (桃園小学校) and Mukodai Elementary School (向台小学校)
 Nakano Hongo Elementary School (中野本郷小学校)
 Nishi Nakano Elementary School (西中野小学校)
 Reiwa Elementary School (令和小学校)
 Merger of Arai Elementary School (新井小学校) and Kamitakada Elementary School (上高田小学校)
 Saginomiya Elementary School (鷺宮小学校)
 Toka Elementary School (桃花小学校)
 Tonoyama Elementary School (塔山小学校)
 Yato Elementary School (谷戸小学校)

Kindergartens:
 Higashi Nakano Kindergarten (ひがしなかの幼稚園)
 Kamisagi Kindergarten (かみさぎ幼稚園)

Private schools
 Horikoshi Gakuen High School
  - Has coeducational and girls' only sections
 
 
 
 
 
  - Girls' school

Colleges and universities
 Teikyo Heisei University Nakano Campus
 Tokyo Polytechnic University
 Meiji University Nakano Campus
 University of Tokyo Nakano campus
 Kokusai Junior College

Transportation

Rail 
Nakano Ward is served by the JR East Chūō and Sobu lines, the Seibu Shinjuku Line, the Tokyo Metro Tozai Line and Tokyo Metro Marunouchi Line, and the Toei Oedo Line.
 JR East
Chūō Line (Rapid), Chūō-Sōbu Line: Higashi-Nakano and Nakano Stations
 Seibu Railway
Seibu Shinjuku Line: Arai Yakushi-mae, Numabukuro, Nogata, Toritsu-Kasei, Saginomiya Stations
 Tokyo Metro
 Marunouchi Line: Shin-Nakano, Nakano-Sakaue Stations
 Honancho Branch Line: Nakano-Fujimicho, Nakano-Shimbashi, Nakano-Sakaue Stations
 Tozai Line: Nakano, Ochiai (although the station is in Shinjuku, some entrances are in Nakano) Stations
 Tokyo Metropolitan Bureau of Transportation:
Toei Oedo Line: Nakano-Sakaue, Higashi-Nakano, Shin-egota Stations

Bus 
A complicated bus network is constructed throughout Nakano Ward because most train lines only run east and west.
 Kanto bus
 Toei bus
 Kokusai Kogyo bus
 Keio bus

Roads
Shuto Expressway:
C2 Central Circular Route (Nakano-chōjabashi exit)
Prefectural road:
 Tokyo Metropolitan Route 8 (Mejiro-dōri Ave., Shin-Mejiro-dōri Ave.)
 Tokyo Metropolitan Route 439 (Senkawa-dōri Ave.)
 Tokyo Metropolitan Route 440 (Shin-Ōme-kaidō Ave.)
 Tokyo Metropolitan Route 25 (Waseda-dōri Ave.)
 Tokyo Metropolitan Route 433 (Ōkubo-dōri Ave.)
 Tokyo Metropolitan Route 4 (Ōme-kaidō Ave.)
 Tokyo Metropolitan Route 14 (Hōnan-dōri Ave.)
 Tokyo Metropolitan Route 317 (Yamate-dōri St.; 6th Beltway)
 Tokyo Metropolitan Route 420 (Nakano-dōri St.)
 Tokyo Metropolitan Route 318 (Kannana-dōri St.; 7th Beltway)
 Tokyo Metropolitan Route 427 (Nakasugi-dōri St.)

Business and entertainment
Nakano-minamiguchi ekimae shōtengai – an outdoor arcade
Soft On Demand – a Japanese adult video group of companies has its headquarters in Nakano

Benza series 

The Benza is a 2019 Amazon Prime Video series about two foreigners (Christopher McCombs and Kyle Card) who are trying to fix their broken  and are suddenly tasked with saving the world. The series  takes place entirely in Higashi Nakano.   Benza English is a 2020 spin-off series  that also takes place in Higashi Nakano. The Benza RPG is a 2020 video game adaption  available on iOS, Android, and Steam.

Notable people
 Kanako Yanagihara, comedian
 Mayumi Kojima, singer and songwriter
 Marika Matsumoto, voice actress, actress
 Shoko Sawada, singer and songwriter
 Yuji Tanaka, comedian
 Ryuichi Sakamoto, composer and musician
 El Lindaman, Japanese professional wrestler
 Yuhi Sekiguchi, Japanese racing driver
 Daigo, Japanese singer-songwriter, actor, talent, and voice actor
 Akiyoshi Nakao, Japanese actor
 Eiji Iijima, Japanese professional shogi player, ranked 7-dan
 Wataru Kamimura, Japanese professional shogi player, ranked 5-dan
 Tsunemi Kubodera, Japanese zoologist (National Museum of Nature and Science)
 Rieko Miura, Japanese actress, voice actress, singer and former member of the J-pop girlgroup Coco
 Masaru Nashimoto, Japanese show-business and gossips reporter
 Makoto Sasaki, Japanese professional shogi player, ranked 7-dan
 Takahiro Sonoda, Japanese classical pianist
 Michiko Yamamoto, Japanese writer and poet (Real Name: Michiko Furuya, Nihongo: 古屋道子, Furuya Michiko)
 Michiyo Yasuda, Japanese animator and colour designer
 Yoko Yamamoto, Japanese actress
 Hideo Kachi, Japanese musician (Real Name: Kachi Hidenori, Nihongo: カチヒデノリ, Hidenori Kachi)
 Kazushi Hagiwara, Japanese mangaka and the creator of Bastard!!
 Kenji Ohtsuki, Japanese rock musician and Seiun Award-winning writer
 Mayumi Kojima, Japanese Shibuya-kei musician
 Shoko Nakagawa, Japanese tarento (media personality), actress, voice actress, illustrator, MC and singer
 Kanako Yanagihara, Japanese actress, comedian, and tarento
 Masao Kobayashi, Japanese politician, member of the Democratic Party of Japan and member of the House of Councillors in the Diet (national legislature)
 Kentaro Shigematsu, Japanese football player (Kamatamare Sanuki, J3 League)
 Mitsuya Kurokawa, Japanese guitarist
 Mayumi Itsuwa, Japanese vocalist, composer, lyricist, and keyboardist
 Masatō Ibu, Japanese actor and voice actor
 Kiyoshiro Imawano, Japanese rock musician, lyricist, composer, musical producer, and actor (Real Name: Kiyoshi Kurihara, Nihongo: 栗原 清志, Kurihara Kiyoshi)
 Ray Fujita, Japanese actor and musician
 Shoko Sawada, Japanese singer-songwriter, reporter, and radio personality
 Tochisakae Atsushi, former sumo wrestler
 Takahiro Yamaguchi, Japanese former soccer player
 Christopher McCombs American actor and tarento

See also

References

External links

Nakano City Official Website 

 
Wards of Tokyo